Miguel Peña (born 12 March 1897, date of death unknown) was a Spanish athlete. He competed in the men's individual cross country event at the 1924 Summer Olympics.

References

External links
 

1897 births
Year of death missing
Athletes (track and field) at the 1924 Summer Olympics
Spanish male long-distance runners
Olympic athletes of Spain
Sportspeople from Bilbao
Olympic cross country runners
Athletes from the Basque Country (autonomous community)